Phoenix Iron Works (also known as Kehoe Iron Foundry) is a historic building located in downtown Savannah, Georgia, United States.

The building, located in Savannah's Trustees' Garden Ward, was completed in 1873. James Monahan was the original owner.

Irishman William Kehoe became the owner of the foundry in 1879 and renamed it, the following year, to Kehoe Iron Foundry. The building was altered in 1883.

The building's 21st-century renovation won the Marguerite Williams Award for Excellence in Rehabilitation.

References 

Savannah Historic District
Commercial buildings in Savannah
Commercial buildings completed in 1873
1873 establishments in Georgia (U.S. state)